The Kwai Tsing District Council is the district council for the Kwai Tsing District in Hong Kong. It is one of 18 such councils. It currently consists of 32 members of which 31 are directly elected from the 31 constituencies of the district, one ex-officio member who is the Tsing Yi Rural Committee chairman. The latest election was held on 24 November 2019.

History
The Kwai Tsing District Council was originally part of the Tsuen Wan District Board until 1985, when a separate Kwai Chung and Tsing Yi District Board was established on 1 April 1985 due to the rapid expansion of population. It was renamed into today's Kwai Tsing District Council in 1988, making it the second youngest existing district council after Yau Tsim Mong District Council. The District Board was partly elected with the ex-officio Regional Council members and Tsing Yi Rural Committee chairman, as well as members appointed by the Governor until 1994 when last Governor Chris Patten refrained from appointing any member.

The Kwai Tsing District Board became Kwai Tsing Provisional District Board after the Hong Kong Special Administrative Region (HKSAR) was established in 1997 with the appointment system being reintroduced by Chief Executive Tung Chee-hwa. The current Kwai Tsing District Council was established on 1 January 2000 after the first District Council election in 1999. The appointed seats were abolished in 2011 after the modified constitutional reform proposal was passed by the Legislative Council in 2010.

The Kwai Tsing District Council had been a stronghold of the pro-democracy camp from 1985 until 2015. Prominent pro-democracy politicians Lee Wing-tat, Sin Chung-kai and Leung Yiu-chung were among the seven pro-democrat activists to become the first members of the council. Lee and Sin had served as council chairmen from 1988 to 1991 and from 1991 to 1994 respectively, representing the Hong Kong Association for Democracy and People's Livelihood (ADPL). The ADPL dominance was replaced by the Democratic Party when the ADPL core members joined the Democrats in the 1990s.

The Democratic Party with the Neighbourhood and Worker's Service Centre (NWSC), which had a strong presence in Shek Yam and Kwai Chung, had comfortable control of the council throughout the 1980s and the early SAR period until their influence began to eclipse in the late 2000s with the pro-Beijing camp actively absorbed the former pro-democrat independents and the Democratic Alliance for the Betterment and Progress of Hong Kong (DAB) and the Hong Kong Federation of Trade Unions (FTU) developed their bases in the district. In the 2007 election when the pan-democrats suffered a territory-wide devastating loss which saw the pro-Beijing camp gained majority of the council for the first time, with the help of the reintroduction of appointment system, where the Chief Executive would appoint pro-government councillors to set off the pro-democracy influence.

In the 2015 election, the Democrats lost its largest party status to DAB for the first time in which the Democrats' seats were down to four by losing half of their seats including the seat in Shek Yam held by its vice-chairman Andrew Wan and the DAB doubled their seats from four to eight, despite the appointment system was abolished in the election. The pro-democrats turned the tide when they scored a landslide victory in the 2019 election amid the massive pro-democracy protests and regained the control of the council by taking 27 of the 31 elected seats. Notable defeated incumbents included legislator Alice Mak of FTU in Wai Ying, while Democratic legislator Andrew Wan regained back his Shek Yam seat from his opponent from DAB.

Political control
Since 1985 political control of the council has been held by the following parties:

Political makeup

Elections are held every four years.

District result maps

Members represented
Starting from 1 January 2020:

Leadership

Chairs
Since 1985, the chairman is elected by all the members of the board:

Vice Chairs

Notes

References

 
Districts of Hong Kong
Kwai Tsing District